Ntournerakia, is a Cretan folk dance from Rethymno, Greece. It is based on the Greek folk dance "chasaposervikos" and is widespread in Crete. 
The name comes from the song "Ntournerakia", by Kostas Mountakis.

See also
Music of Greece
Greek dances
 Link to the tune and song Ntournerakia

References
Ελληνικοί παραδοσιακοί χοροί: Ντουρνεράκια

Greek dances